Whalers may refer to:

Geography
Whalers Bluff Lighthouse, Victoria, Australia

Sports
Danbury Whalers, US ice-hockey team in the Federal Hockey League
Hartford Whalers, former US ice-hockey team
New Bedford Whalers, name of three US soccer teams
Plymouth Whalers, US ice-hockey team in the Ontario Hockey League
Sag Harbor Whalers, US collegiate summer baseball team

Entertainment
 Whalers (film), a 1939 Swedish film

See also 
:Category:People in whaling, people in the whaling industry
Whaler (disambiguation)
Whaling
The Wailers (disambiguation)